Tapeinostemon is a genus of flowering plants in the family Gentianaceae, native to northern South America. It has microreticulate pollen grains, supporting its placement in the tribe Saccifolieae.

Species
Currently accepted species include:

Tapeinostemon adulans J.R.Grant
Tapeinostemon breweri Steyerm. & Maguire
Tapeinostemon jauaensis Steyerm. & Maguire
Tapeinostemon longiflorus Maguire & Steyerm.
Tapeinostemon rugosus Maguire & Steyerm.
Tapeinostemon sessiliflorus (Humb. & Bonpl. ex Schult.) Pruski & S.F.Sm.
Tapeinostemon spenneroides Benth.
Tapeinostemon zamoranus Steyerm.

References

Gentianaceae genera
Gentianaceae